Bernard Granville Baker (23 October 1870 – 12 March 1957) (known as B. Granville Baker) was a British soldier and painter specialising in military subjects. He wrote and illustrated a number of books.

Life and work

Baker was born in Pune (then called Poona) in India. He was the son of Montagu Bernard Baker, who worked for the British East India Company, and his wife Harriet Fanny Bangh.

He was educated at Winchester College and the Military Academy at Dresden. He served in the 21st (Empress of India's) Hussars in India and Burma. He fought in the Boer Wars in South Africa in 1900. In the First World War, he became a Lieutenant-Colonel and commanded a battalion of the Yorkshire Regiment. He was awarded the Distinguished Service Order in 1918.

Baker is known for his illustrations and watercolour paintings of military subjects, such as "Sir John Moore at Corunna, January 16th 1809" in the 1920s. He exhibited his paintings at Liverpool's Walker Art Gallery and the London Salon between 1914 and 1930, as well as in his home town of Beccles in Suffolk.

He wrote and illustrated a number of books. The Danube with Pen and Pencil (1911) has a dedication to "My Right Good Friend and Genial Host Guido Elbogen of Schloss Thalheim, Lower Austria". Guido Elbogen (1845–1918) was the father of Jenny Elbogen who inherited Schloss Thalheim. Jenny, her husband Friedrich Weleminsky and son Anton Weleminsky fled the Nazis in 1939 and came to England under the guarantee of "an English ex-army Colonel" in Beccles who was Bernard Granville Baker.  From a Terrace in Prague has the dedication "This book is dedicated to a wise and gentle lady who looks out upon life from a terrace", while A Winter Holiday in Portugal has "This book is dedicated to a lady, fair and gracious who lives in Lisbon".

He was a Justice of the Peace for Suffolk. He was elected a Fellow of the Royal Geographical Society and of the Royal Historical Society.

In 1897 he married Lorina Hartley, daughter of Rev A O Hartley. Lorina, who was also an artist, died in 1942.

Baker died in Beccles in 1957.

Works

 The Walls of Constantinople (2 volumes, 1910)
 The Danube with Pen and Pencil (1911)
 A Winter Holiday in Portugal (1912) (with C. Gasquoine Hartley)
 The Passing of the Turkish Empire in Europe (1913)
 The German Army from within. By a British officer who has served in it (1914) (with Thomas Burke)
 Hutchinson's History of the Nations (1915, including The Sea! The Sea!)
 Types of the Allied Armies (1914–1918) (with "Oilette")
 Soldiers of the World (1914–1918) (with "Oilette")
 From a Terrace in Prague (1923)
 Waveney. Illustrated (1924)
 Blithe Waters: Sheaves out of Suffolk (1931)
 Old Cavalry Stations (1934)

References

External links
 
 

1870 births
1957 deaths
19th-century British painters
19th-century English male artists
20th-century British painters
20th-century British male writers
20th-century British writers
20th-century British male artists
Artists from Pune
British Army personnel of the Second Boer War
British Army personnel of World War I
British male painters
Green Howards officers
Companions of the Distinguished Service Order
English illustrators
English justices of the peace
English watercolourists
Fellows of the Royal Geographical Society
Fellows of the Royal Historical Society
Military art
People educated at Winchester College
People from Beccles
Writers who illustrated their own writing
Yorkshire Regiment officers